Kavali Municipal Council is the local self-government in Kavali, a town in the Indian state of Andhra Pradesh. It is classified as a first grade municipality.

Jurisdiction 

Administration 

The municipality was constituted on 1 April 1967. The Elected Wing of the municipality consists of a municipal council, which has elected members and is headed by a Chairperson. Whereas, the  Executive Wing is headed by a municipal commissioner. The present municipal commissioner of the town is B.Siva Reddy.

List of Municipal Chairmans

Kavali Municipal Elections

See also 
 List of municipalities in Andhra Pradesh

References 

Municipal Councils in Andhra Pradesh
1967 establishments in Andhra Pradesh
Government agencies established in 1967
Urban local bodies in Andhra Pradesh
Local government in Andhra Pradesh
Kavali